The Washington Glory was a women's softball team based in Fairfax, Virginia. They played during 2007 and 2008 as a member of National Pro Fastpitch.

History 
The Glory won the 2007 NPF championship, defeating the Rockford Thunder in the final game of the championship series becoming the first team in league history to win the regular season and playoff titles in the same season.  The playoffs started out on a high note for the Glory when Monica Abbott threw her first professional no hitter and the first no hitter in Glory history in the August 25 opener against Rockford.

The first batter in Glory history was Kelly Kretschman on May 31. The first home run in Glory history was by Brooke Marnitz on May 31.

The Glory played their 2008 season at the Westfield Softball Complex in Chantilly, Va. due to construction on their complex at George Mason University.  During the 2008 season, the Glory's Desiree Serrano threw the first perfect game in team history, blanking the Venezuela national team.

The Glory were to return for the 2009 season; however financial difficulties by ownership led National Pro Fastpitch (NPF) to attempt to find a new owner, but the team carried too much debt and was folded. Glory player contracts were acquired by the replacement USSSA Pride franchise based in Florida.

Hall of fame
Three Glory players were named to the All NPF Team in 2008. Those players were:
3B Sara Larquier
1B Oli Keohohou
P Sarah Pauly

USA Softball players
Monica Abbott
Kelly Kretschman
Stacey Nelson

Season-by-season 

|-
|2007 || 34 || 10 || 0 || 1st place National Pro Fastpitch || Won National Pro Fastpitch Championship Game over the Rockford Thunder 
|-
|2008 || 30 || 18 || 0 || 2nd place National Pro Fastpitch || Lost National Pro Fastpitch Championship Game to the  Chicago Bandits
|-
!Totals || 64 || 28 || 0
|colspan="2"|

Former players
 3: Stephanie Best (Retired after 2008 season)
 8: Christa Dalakis (Running a health club in Tysons Corner, Virginia)
 27: Germaine Fairchild (Head Coach of the former National Pro Fastpitch team New England Riptide)

Staff
 Dr. David R. Miller, M.D.: Hand and wrist consultant.
 Jarrod Wronski: Team P. A. announcer, broadcaster, emcee and DJ

External links 
 Washington Glory
 
 MySpace Page

  
 

  
 
  

 
Softball teams
Fairfax County, Virginia
Sports clubs established in 2007
Sports clubs disestablished in 2008
Defunct softball teams in the United States
Defunct National Pro Fastpitch teams
2007 establishments in Virginia
2008 disestablishments in Virginia
Defunct sports teams in Virginia